The Star Awards for Best Variety Special is an award presented annually at the Star Awards, a ceremony that was established in 1994.

The category was introduced in 1998, at the 5th Star Awards ceremony; NKF 5th Anniversary Charity Show received the award and it is given in honour of a Mediacorp variety special which has delivered an outstanding overall performance. The nominees are determined by a team of judges employed by Mediacorp; winners are selected by a majority vote from the entire judging panel.

Since its inception, the award has been given to 19 variety specials. Star Awards 2019 is the most recent winner in this category. Since the ceremony held in 2015, NKF Charity Show and Star Awards remain as the only two variety specials to win in this category six times, surpassing Ren Ci Charity Show which has two wins. In addition, Star Awards has been nominated on 18 occasions, more than any other variety special. Lunar New Year's Eve Special holds the record for most nominations without a win, with 11.

The award was not presented in 2000 & 2018.

Recipients

 Each year is linked to the article about the Star Awards held that year.

Category facts
Most wins

Most nominations

See also 
Star Awards
Star Awards for Best Variety Show Host

References

External links 

Star Awards